The TM-83 is a Soviet off-route shaped charge anti-tank mine, first shown publicly in 1993, and developed in 1983. The mine consists of a large Misznay Schardin effect warhead and is actived using its infra-red and seismic sensors.

Deployment 
The mine can be installed on soil, or be attached to various objects only manually. The mine is generally positioned 5 meters from the road, and it is intended to attack and aimed using an integrated sight.

The TM-83 can be deployed in two operation modes – autonomous or controlled. The primary difference is that the controlled version has a 100-meter-long wire attached, allowing the operator to switch it through its various modes repeatedly (safe or active, see ). If the mine is controlled, it can be switched to its safety mode and be easily removed; however, if the mine is in its autonomous mode, it is considered impossible to remove due to the high sensitivity of the seismic sensor and the chance that the mine will be set off by the infrared emissions of the human body 10 meters from any direction. If the engineer desired to destroy the mine in its autonomous mode, then it is only possible with large caliber machine gun fire. 

The mine installation by two trained personnel takes 15-20 minutes.

Action 
The mine has two modes of operation after deployment: using its infra-red or seismic sensors, which can be classified as "active" and "passive" respectively. The seismic sensor allows the mine to work in "standby" mode and requires less power to run, as the mine has a set of batteries, and, thus, a limited energy source. As soon as the seismic sensor detects an approaching target, the mine switches to its "active" mode, toggling the use of its infra-red sensor. The mine explodes when the target enters the range of detection by the infra-red sensor. At a range of 5–50 meters, the mine is claimed to penetrate 100 mm of armour at 30° LOS, creating a hole 80 mm in diameter. If no target was detected by the IR sensor three minutes after the infra-red sensor is activated, the mine switches back to its "standby" mode.

Specifications 

 Weight
 Full assembly: 28.1 kg
 Mine: 20.4 kg
 Detonator: 2.7 kg
 Charge: 9.6 kg of TG-40 (60/40 RDX/TNT - very similar to Composition B)
 Dimensions: 45.5x37.7x44 cm
 Shelf life: 10 years
 Temperature range of use: -30 to +50 °С
 Action time: 30 days until a battery change is required
 Sensor sensitivity
 Seismic sensor: 200-250 m (tank)
 Infra-red sensor: 90-120 m (tank)

See also 

 PFM-1
 PMN mine
 PTM-3 mine
 Misznay Schardin effect

Notes 

Anti-tank mines
Land mines of the Soviet Union